Argyrochosma incana, the hairy false cloak fern, is a fern known from the southwestern United States through Mexico to Guatemala, and from a disjunct population in the Dominican Republic. It grows on rocky slopes and steep banks, often in forests. Like many of the false cloak ferns, it bears white powder on the underside of its leaves. First described as a species in 1825, it was transferred to the new genus Argyrochosma (the "false cloak ferns") in 1987, recognizing their distinctness from the "cloak ferns" (Notholaena sensu stricto).

Description
Argyrochosma incana is a medium-sized epipetric fern. The rhizome is short, thick, and may be horizontal or somewhat upright. They are of a uniform dark, shiny brown, chestnut-brown or yellowish-brown color with some dark brown patches. From the rhizome, the fronds arise in clumps. Of this length, about half is made up by the stipe (the stalk of the leaf, below the blade), which is shiny and round, hairless, and dark purple to black in color, occasionally chestnut-brown.

The leaf blades are deltate (triangular) or lanceolate, tripinnate (cut into pinnae, pinnules and pinnulets) to almost quadripinnate at their bases. The rachis (leaf axis) is round or slightly flattened. The rachis and the axes of the leaf segments are all dark in color; the color stops abruptly at a joint at the base of the leaf segment. Each blade bears 6 to 9 pairs of pinnae, borne oppositely, or nearly so, on the rachis. They are deltate to ovate in shape and borne on long stalks. The leaf tissue is grayish-green in color and leathery in texture. The underside of the leaf is coated in white farina (powder), which may be sparsely scattered on the upper surface or absent from it. The leaf axes curl upwards when dry.

The veins themselves tend to blend into the leaf tissue. The leaf edges are not curved under or modified into false indusia. Each sporangium bears 64 spores. The plants are diploid, with a chromosome number of 2n = 54.

Within the heart of its range, in Mexico, A. incana is both the most widespread member of the genus and the most variable. Material collected in several states of northern Mexico, with small segments, somewhat zig-zag and dark purplish axes may represent an as yet undescribed species. Two specimens collected by C. H. Müller and his wife Mary in Nuevo Leon are anomalous in having chestnut-brown axes and rougher spores, similar to A. delicatula, but their size, abundance of farina below, and lack of it above, led Maxon and Weatherby to classify them as A. incana.

In Mexico, A. incana closely resembles A. delicatula, from which it is distinguished by having white (rather than pale yellow) farina, and A. formosa, which lacks farina. Most specimens in the United States were originally mislabeled as A. limitanea, but this species lacks the joint and abrupt end of dark color at the base of its leaf segments.

Taxonomy
It was first described in 1825 by Carl Borivoj Presl as Notholaena incana, based on material collected by Thaddäus Haenke in Mexico. He did not explain why he chose the species epithet incana, meaning "hoary" (grayish-white). In 1859, Mettenius recognized the genus Gymnogramma for species where sporangia were borne along the nerves and not densely clustered at the end of the nerves. He independently described the species based on material collected by Eugénio Schmitz in Mexico, naming it G. candida. The epithet refers to the chalk-white color of the farina beneath the leaves. Prantl expanded Pellaea to include several genera in which he perceived close affinities, including Gymnogramma. Accordingly, he transferred G. candida to Pellaea section Cincinalis as P. candida in 1882.

William Ralph Maxon and Charles Alfred Weatherby placed N. incana within a group of ferns closely related to Notholaena nivea. Both Edwin Copeland and Weatherby suggested in the 1940s that this group of ferns might represent a distinct genus of its own. This was finally addressed in 1987 by Michael D. Windham, who was carrying out phylogenetic studies of these genera. He elevated Notholaena sect. Argyrochosma to become the genus Argyrochosma, and transferred this species to that genus as A. incana. Meanwhile, John Mickel and Joe Beitel had transferred the species to Cheilanthes as C. incana in their monograph on the ferns of Oaxaca, which was published in 1988; Mickel and Alan R. Smith recognized Argyrochosma in 2004 when preparing a fern flora of Mexico. In 2018, Maarten J. M. Christenhusz transferred the species to Hemionitis as H. incana, as part of a program to consolidate the cheilanthoid ferns into that genus.

While the distinctness of A. delicatula from A. incana has been questioned in the past, phylogenetic studies have upheld the separation of the two taxa. It lies within a subclade of the genus that also contains A. incana, A. pallens, A. peninsularis, A. palmeri, and A. pilifera. All members of the clade share pale farina principally composed of terpenoid compounds, unlike the dihydrostilbenoids found in the farina of other members of the genus.

Distribution and habitat
Argyrochosma incana is known from New Mexico and Arizona south through most of the states of Mexico to Guatemala, and also as a disjunct in the Dominican Republic. David Lellinger reports a specimen (Gómez 7156, CR) collected in Costa Rica, although this occurrence is not mentioned in other floras.

In Mexico, it grows on rocky slopes, banks, and ledges, often shaded or in woods, especially pine-oak forests. Irving Knobloch reported that material collected from rock crevices in Chihuahua was growing in neutral soils within the crevices. At the northern edge of its range, in the United States, it is found growing from canyon walls, exclusively on igneous rock. In Guatemala, it is found on both shaded and sunny rocks, and growing from rock walls and cliff crevices.

Conservation
Under the NatureServe conservation status system, A. incana is ranked as secure (G5), but it is considered imperiled in Arizona.

Notes and references

References

Works cited

incana
Plants described in 1825
Ferns of Mexico
Ferns of the United States